Stepan Mailovich Maryanyan (born 21 September 1991) is a Russian Greco-Roman wrestler of Armenian descent. He came in first place at the 2013 Wrestling World Cup and was runner-up at the 2015 Russian Nationals Greco-Roman. During the 2015 European Games held in Baku, Azerbaijan, Maryanyan won a gold medal for 59 kg Greco-Roman wrestling. This was the first ever gold for Russia at the European Games. 2018 World Champion at 63 kilos.

In 2020, he won the silver medal in the 60 kg event at the 2020 Individual Wrestling World Cup held in Belgrade, Serbia. In 2021, he won one of the bronze medals in the 60 kg event at the 2021 World Wrestling Championships held in Oslo, Norway.

References

External links 
 

1991 births
Living people
People from Dinskoy District
Russian people of Armenian descent
Russian male sport wrestlers
European Games gold medalists for Russia
European Games medalists in wrestling
Wrestlers at the 2015 European Games
World Wrestling Championships medalists
Wrestlers at the 2019 European Games
European Wrestling Championships medalists
Sportspeople from Krasnodar Krai